Grand Tour is a tour of European cultural centres that once was a standard feature of the education of the European elite.

Grand Tour may also refer to:

Entertainment

Music
 Grand Tour (Big Big Train album)
 The Grand Tour (album), 1974 album by George Jones
 The Grand Tour, a 1993 album by Aaron Neville
 "The Grand Tour" (song), title track from Jones' 1974 album
 The Grand Tour (musical), a 1979 Broadway musical
 Grand Tour, a 1959 musical with music by David Shire
 Grand Tour: The Classic, a 2013 Asian live concert tour of South Korean boyband Shinhwa
 Grand Tour: The Return, a 2012 Asian live concert tour of South Korean boyband Shinhwa

Other entertainment
 Grand Tour (novel series) (1985–2017), series of science fiction novels by Ben Bova
 Grand Tour: Disaster in Time, a 1992 science fiction film (a.k.a. Timescape)
 The Grand Tour, a British motoring television series
 The Grand Tour Game, a 2019 video game

Other uses
 Grand Tour, an educational trip around the cultural highlights of Europe.
 Grand Tour (cycling), collective term given to three European cycling races
 Grand Tour (data visualisation), a technique used to explore multivariate statistical data
 Grand Tour program, proposed NASA mission to visit the outer planets in the 1970s
 Corris Railway Grand Tour, tourist service in Wales between 1886 and 1930, connecting the Corris and Talyllyn Railways

See also
 Gran Turismo (disambiguation)
 Grand (disambiguation)
 Tour (disambiguation)